Joe Smith (born 11 November 1953 in Glasgow) is a Scottish former footballer, who played for Aberdeen, Arbroath, Motherwell, Peterhead and Dunfermline.

External links 

AFC Heritage profile

1953 births
Living people
Footballers from Glasgow
Association football midfielders
Scottish footballers
Aberdeen F.C. players
Arbroath F.C. players
Motherwell F.C. players
Peterhead F.C. players
Dunfermline Athletic F.C. players
Highland Football League players
Scottish Football League players
Scotland under-23 international footballers